This is a list of lists related to crime in the United States.

Criminals and suspected criminals

Individuals 
 FBI Ten Most Wanted Fugitives
 Former FBI Ten Most Wanted Fugitives
 List of American mobsters of Irish descent
 List of Depression-era outlaws
 List of Italian-American mobsters
 List of Jewish American mobsters
 List of Old West gunfighters
 List of rampage killers (familicides in the United States)
 List of serial killers in the United States
 List of United States federal officials convicted of corruption offenses
 List of United States local officials convicted of federal corruption offenses
 List of United States state officials convicted of federal corruption offenses
 List of United States unincorporated territory officials convicted of federal corruption offenses

Groups 
 List of California street gangs
 List of criminal gangs in Los Angeles
 List of gangs in the United States
 
 List of Old West gangs

Crimes 

 
 List of 2012 murders in the United States
 List of incidents of civil unrest in the United States
 List of mass shootings in the United States
 List of school shootings in the United States (before 2000)
 List of school shootings in the United States (2000-present)
 List of shootings in Colorado
 List of United States presidential assassination attempts and plots

Victims 

 Emergency workers killed in the September 11 attacks
 List of American police officers killed in the line of duty
 List of journalists killed in the United States
 List of lynching victims in the United States
 List of murdered American children

Statistics 
 Gun violence in the United States by state
 List of U.S. states by homicide rate
 List of U.S. states by incarceration and correctional supervision rate
 List of United States cities by crime rate (population 250,000+)
 United States cities by crime rate (100,000–250,000)
 United States cities by crime rate (60,000–100,000)
 United States cities by crime rate (40,000–60,000)

Other 
 List of deaths and violence at the Cecil Hotel
 List of detention sites in the United States
 List of killings by law enforcement officers in the United States
 List of punishments for murder in the United States
 Lists of people executed in the United States
 List of U.S. criminal justice academics
 List of U.S. military prisons
 List of United States federal prisons
 Lists of United States state prisons
 Overturned convictions in the United States